Bilnə (also, Bilna and Bil’na) is a village and municipality in the Yardymli Rayon of Azerbaijan.  It has a population of 386.

References 

Populated places in Yardimli District